Zermizinga indocilisaria is a species of moth in the family Geometridae. It was first described by Francis Walker in 1863. This species found in New Zealand and is said to be found in Tasmania, Australia.

References

Ennominae
Moths of New Zealand
Moths of Australia
Moths described in 1863
Endemic fauna of New Zealand
Taxa named by Francis Walker (entomologist)
Endemic moths of New Zealand